N-acetyllactosaminide beta-1,3-N-acetylglucosaminyltransferase is an enzyme that, in humans, is encoded by the B3GNT1 gene.

β-1,4-glucuronyltransferase 
The B3GNT1 gene encodes a β-1,4-glucuronyltransferase, designated B4GAT1, that transfers glucuronic acid towards both α- and β-anomers of xylose. B4GAT1 is the priming enzyme for LARGE, a dual-activity glycosyltransferase that is capable of extending products of B4GAT1. Thus, B4GAT1 is involved in the initiation of the LARGE-dependent repeating disaccharide that is necessary for extracellular matrix protein binding to O-mannosylated α-dystroglycan that is lacking in secondary dystroglycanopathies.

Misidentification 
The B3GNT1 gene was first reported to encode a member of the beta-1,3-N-acetylglucosaminyltransferase family and thought to be responsible for the synthesis of poly-N-acetyllactosamine, a determinant for the blood group i antigen. Thus, it was also known as iGNT.

References

Further reading

External links